Lake Mamacocha (possibly from Quechua mama mother / madam /  qucha lake, mama qucha ocean, Mama Qucha) or Lake Yanacocha is a lake in Peru located in the Cajamarca Region, Cajamarca Province, Encañada District.

References 

Lakes of Peru
Lakes of Cajamarca Region